Lexington Academy may refer to a number of academic establishments including:
Lexington Academy founded by Robert Tilton in Texas and now defunct
 Lexington Academy, PS72 131 East 104th Street, New York

See also 
 Lexington Christian Academy (disambiguation)